Patsy Ann Rippy Bond of Shawnee, Oklahoma, was an American amateur tennis player in the 1960s who represented her country in the Pan American Games. She was a four-time winner of the Oklahoma high school state singles championship and led her team to a state championship. While a high school student she was ranked #1 in the Missouri Valley. In 1965 she advanced to the third round of the National Women's Championship at Forest Hills and was ranked #13 in the country. She graduated from Shawnee High School in 1966.

Rippy won the 1967 NCAA Championship while at Odessa College in Odessa, Texas. Also that year she represented the United States in the 1967 Pan-American Games in Winnipeg, Canada, winning a gold medal in doubles (with Jane Albert) and a silver in singles. She then went to the University of Texas at El Paso and was Southwest Intercollegiate Champion in both singles and doubles.

Also in 1967, she reached the singles final in Cincinnati before falling to Jane Bartkowicz, but paired with Bartkowicz to take the doubles title. In 1966 in Cincinnati, she reached the doubles final with Becky Vest and reached the singles semifinals.

As a junior player, Rippy was selected as Shawnee High School Athlete of the Year during her senior year at Shawnee. In 1962, she paired with Paulette Verzin to win the USTA National Hard Court Champions Girls’ 14 Doubles title. She was the runner-up to Bartkowicz at both the 1964 USTA National 16s and the 1966 USTA National 18s.

She played at Odessa, TX Junior College and later at University of Texas at El Paso. She earned several tennis championships then worked as a pro at several tennis clubs.

Rippy has been enshrined in the USTA/Missouri Valley Hall of Fame and the U.S. Tennis Hall of Fame.

She was married to Kenneth Bond and had daughters, Becky and Karen, step-children Kasie, Kevin and Kelly. She was a third grade teacher in West Valley City, Utah. She died December 3, 2019 in Utah.

Sources
USTA/Missouri Valley
From Club Court to Center Court by Phillip S. Smith (2008 Edition).

Living people
American female tennis players
Odessa College alumni
Sportspeople from Oklahoma City
Tennis people from Oklahoma
Tennis players at the 1967 Pan American Games
Pan American Games medalists in tennis
Year of birth missing (living people)
Pan American Games gold medalists for the United States
Pan American Games silver medalists for the United States
21st-century American women
College women's tennis players in the United States
Medalists at the 1967 Pan American Games